The Kovak Box is a 2006 psychological thriller film directed by Daniel Monzón and starring Timothy Hutton, Lucía Jiménez, Annette Badland and David Kelly. The film concerns an American horror/science fiction novelist who finds the plot of one of his stories unfold around him after a conference in Spain.

Synopsis 
On the island city of Palma de Mallorca, David Norton (Hutton) promotes his latest book, The Kovak Box before a small private gathering of European fans. While nothing unusual happens, one of the audience members has a distinctive Russian Mafia arm tattoo, and the hotel concierges are subtly condescending towards Norton, despite the writer's mannered patronage and celebrity status.

Later in the evening, Norton's fiancee, Jane, receives an anonymous phone call and jumps off their hotel balcony. After Jane dies from her injuries in the hospital, Norton discovers a nearby patient, Silvia Mendez (Jiménez), did the same thing on the same night: While taking a shower, Silvia answered a call consisting only of the 1933 song Gloomy Sunday by composer Rezső Seress. After jumping from her window, she only remembers waking up nude under a crushed bar canopy. Silvia is a young nightclub debutante with no enemies or connections to the American couple. While Silvia recuperates in her apartment, a mysterious man attempts to stab her in the back of the neck but flees after their struggle. After the attack, Silvia reunites with Norton, who is also being pursued by unknown assailants.

Norton finds that the events coincide with the plot of his latest book, which is based on a real individual: Frank Kovak (Kelly), a Hungarian doctor who was disgraced and driven to exile after his experiments were passed off as psychological warfare. Kovak used neural implants and paid a network of criminals to reproduce the experiment—in which everyone takes their life (or suffers a brutal death) while the Gloomy Sunday song plays—on Norton. Ailing from a terminal brain tumor, Kovak has nothing to lose except Norton winning his deadly game.

Cast 
 Timothy Hutton as David Norton
 Lucía Jiménez as Silvia Mendez
 David Kelly as Frank Kovak
 Georgia Mackenzie as Jane Graham (as Georgia MacKenzie)
 Gary Piquer as Jaume
 Annette Badland as Kathy
 Isabel Abarraga as Judy
 Jorge Aguado de Gabriel as Man with Umbilical Cord
 Ralph Angrick as Lift Passenger
 Ana Asensio as CNW Announcer
 Nina Bagusat as  Hostess
 Keith Bartlett  as Admirer
 Julio Bastida as Telecinco Announcer
 Jorge Bosch as Forensic
 Nicholas Boulton as Consulate Employee

References

External links 
 

2006 films
British psychological thriller films
Films about suicide
Films about writers
Films about organized crime
2006 psychological thriller films
Films shot in Mallorca
Films shot in Madrid
English-language Spanish films
Spanish thriller films
2000s mystery thriller films
Films set in the Balearic Islands
Films scored by Roque Baños
Films with screenplays by Jorge Guerricaechevarría
2000s English-language films
2000s British films
2000s Spanish films
Spanish psychological thriller films